The black-and-crimson oriole (Oriolus cruentus) is a species of bird in the family Oriolidae.

It is found in Indonesia and Malaysia where its natural habitats are subtropical or tropical moist lowland forest and subtropical or tropical moist montane forest.

Taxonomy and systematics
The black-and-crimson oriole was originally described in the genus Leptopteryx (a synonym for Artamella). Along with the black, maroon and silver orioles, it belongs to a clade of red and black orioles. Alternate names for the black-and-crimson oriole include the black-crimson oriole and crimson-breasted oriole.

Subspecies
Four subspecies are recognized: 
 O. c. malayanus - Robinson & Kloss, 1923: Found on the Malay Peninsula
 O. c. consanguineus - (Ramsay, RGW, 1881): Originally described as a separate species. Found on Sumatra
 O. c. cruentus - (Wagler, 1827): Found on Java
 O. c. vulneratus - Sharpe, 1887: Originally described as a separate species. Found on northern Borneo

References

External links
Image at ADW 

Oriolus
Orioles
Birds described in 1827
Taxonomy articles created by Polbot